Nar Qeshlaqi (also Romanized as Nar Qeshlāqī) is a village in Anjirlu Rural District, in the Central District of Bileh Savar County, Ardabil Province, Iran. At the 2006 census, its population was 32, in 10 families.

References 

Towns and villages in Bileh Savar County